Mélodie Collard and Leylah Fernandez were the defending champions but both players chose not to participate.

Arianne Hartono and Olivia Tjandramulia won the title, defeating Catherine Harrison and Yanina Wickmayer in the final, 5–7, 7–6(7–3), [10–8].

Seeds

Draw

Draw

References

External Links
Main Draw

Challenger Banque Nationale de Saguenay - Doubles